P104 may refer to:

 , a patrol boat of the Mexican Navy
 Papyrus 104, a biblical manuscript
 P104, a state regional road in Latvia